The 1994 FIA Touring Car World Cup was the second running of the FIA Touring Car World Cup. It was held on 16 October 1994 at Donington Park in the United Kingdom. Unlike the previous year's edition, the 1994 event was run over just a single race. Paul Radisich won the event for a second time, while Germany was the winning nation. The winning driver was also awarded the RAC Tourist Trophy, the first time the Trophy had been awarded since 1988.

Entry list

 Rickard Rydell was unable to compete for Sweden due to a collapsed lung. He would have driven a Volvo 850.
 Alain Cudini appeared on the entry list for France driving an Opel Vectra, but did not participate.

Report
Initially, it was John Cleland that made the best getaway, vaulting from his grid position of fourth to take an early lead from front-row starters Paul Radisich and Steve Soper. Several drivers meanwhile, including Shaun van der Linde, Kieth O’Dor, Jan Lammers, David Leslie and Phillipe Gache were eliminated from the race almost immediately after a multi-car collision in the middle of the pack.  Later in the lap, Alain Menu clouted the rear of Frank Biela's Audi on the approach to the Melbourne Hairpin, resulting in the Swiss driver's retirement. It was at this point the red flags were shown to allow the numerous stranded cars to be moved.

At the restart, Cleland failed to replicate his excellent start, the top four rounding the first corner in grid order. Stefano Modena rammed the rear of Anthony Reid's Vauxhall at the Esses on the first lap, taking both men out of the race, whilst Gabriele Tarquini's late braking two corners later at Goddards resulted in the retirement of both Cleland and Emanuele Pirro, both of whom had passed Tarquini at the previous corner.  Tarquini continued but lost several positions as he recovered from the grass.

This promoted Tim Harvey into third position behind Radisich and Soper, but his retirement due to head gasket failure ended a miserable day for the Renault team. Biela thus assumed third position from Joachim Winkelhock and Roberto Ravaglia, though the latter would soon lose fifth position after being pressured into out-braking himself at the Esses by a resurgent Tarquini and Yvan Muller. Winkelhock later made light contact with compatriot Biela as the pair battled for third position. This cost Biela two positions, though the German would then beach his Audi in the gravel at Coppice as he attempted to catch up.

Radisich was able to maintain his healthy advantage over Soper to secure his second consecutive World Cup, with Winkelhock holding off Tarquini to complete the podium. After Biela's retirement, Hans-Joachim Stuck finished in fifth after qualifying in a lowly 21st, with Johnny Cecotto, Muller and Markus Oestrich rounding out the top eight finishers. Soper and Winkelhock's podium finishes were sufficient for BMW to win the manufacturers title, whilst the efforts of Winkelhock, Stuck and Oestrich secured Germany the Nations Cup.

Results

Drivers' standings

Nations' standings

Manufacturers' Trophy

References

 http://forums.autosport.com/lofiversion/index.php/t97765.html
 http://www.supertouringregister.com/series/174/
 http://www.driverdb.com/standings/1190-1994/

1994
Touring Car World Cup
Touring Car World Cup
RAC Tourist Trophy
October 1994 sports events in the United Kingdom